Ricardo Cardona may refer to:

 Ricardo Cardona (chef), chef in New York City
 Ricardo Cardona (boxer) (1952–2015), Colombian boxer